Scrobipalpa kumatai is a moth in the family Gelechiidae. It was described by Povolný in 1977. It is found in Nepal.

References

Scrobipalpa
Moths described in 1977
Taxa named by Dalibor Povolný